NCAA Division I basketball tournament or NCAA Division I basketball championship may refer to:

NCAA Division I men's basketball tournament 
NCAA Division I women's basketball tournament

See also
NCAA basketball tournament (disambiguation)
NCAA Final Four (Philippines)